Cyligramma fluctuosa is a moth of the family Noctuidae. It is found in most parts of Africa, from Sénégal in the West to Kenya in the East, and Egypt in the North to South Africa, including the Indian Ocean islands

It has a wingspan of approx. 8–9 cm.

References

Catocalinae
Moths described in 1773
Moths of the Comoros
Owlet moths of Africa
Moths of Madagascar
Moths of Mauritius
Moths of Réunion
Taxa named by Dru Drury